Lakhimpur Girls' College, established in 1972, is a women's general degree college situated in Lakhimpur, Assam. This college is affiliated with the Dibrugarh University. This college offers bachelor's degree courses in arts and science.

References

External links
http://lgcollege.ac.in/file/

Women's universities and colleges in Assam
Colleges affiliated to Dibrugarh University
Educational institutions established in 1972
1972 establishments in Assam